Hajji Qaderdad Bazar (also Romanized as Ḩājjī Qāderdād Bāzār; also known as Ḩājīqāder Bāzār) is a village in Negur Rural District, Dashtiari District, Chabahar County, Sistan and Baluchestan Province, Iran. At the 2006 census, its population was 211, in 37 families.

References 

Populated places in Chabahar County